The  was a class of two support ships of the Imperial Japanese Navy (IJN), serving during World War II.

Construction
In 1939, the IJN planned two support ship classes to help their aircraft carriers. One was the 8,000-ton , the other one the 4,500 ton Sunosaki class. The Sunosaki was planned to support for two medium-sized carriers ( and ) in the battlefield. The thought is the same as USS Sacramento.

Service
The Sunosaki class was unable to support Japan's carrier task force, because their commissions were delayed. They sailed between the Japanese mainland and Southeast Asia, and were lost before participating in a naval battle.

Ships in class

References
, History of Pacific War Vol.62 "Ships of The Imperial Japanese Forces, Gakken (Japan), January 2008, 
Ships of the World special issue Vol.47, Auxiliary Vessels of the Imperial Japanese Navy, (Japan), March 1997

World War II naval ships of Japan
Auxiliary ships of the Imperial Japanese Navy
World War II tankers
Ships built by Mitsubishi Heavy Industries